Country Style was an Australian television variety series which aired on ABC during 1958. ABC series typically had shorter seasons than shows on commercial television, which was also the case with Country Style.

Performers who appeared on the series included the Balamindi Harmony Club, singer Pat Spencer, singer Frank Ifield, violinist Geza Bachman dance caller Garry Cohen, singer Myrna Dodd, and singer Geoff Horner

References

External links

Country music television series
1958 Australian television series debuts
1958 Australian television series endings
Black-and-white Australian television shows
English-language television shows
Australian music television series
Australian Broadcasting Corporation original programming